The 1996 Wagner Seahawks football team represented Wagner College in the 1996 NCAA Division I-AA football season as a member of the Northeast Conference (NEC). This year was the team's first season as a member of the Northeast Conference after their transition from being an NCAA Division I-AA independent program. The Seahawks were led by 16th-year head coach Walt Hameline and played their home games at Wagner College Stadium. Wagner finished the season 5–5 overall and 2–2 in NEC play to tie for second place.

Schedule

References

Wagner
Wagner Seahawks football seasons
Wagner Seahawks football